This article comprises three sortable tables of major mountain peaks of the islands of the Caribbean Sea.

The summit of a mountain or hill may be measured in three principal ways:
The topographic elevation of a summit measures the height of the summit above a geodetic sea level.  The first table below ranks the 20 highest major summits of the Caribbean by elevation.
The topographic prominence of a summit is a measure of how high the summit rises above its surroundings.  The second table below ranks the 20 most prominent summits of the Caribbean.
The topographic isolation (or radius of dominance) of a summit measures how far the summit lies from its nearest point of equal elevation.  The third table below ranks the 20 most isolated major summits of the Caribbean.



Highest major summits

Of the 20 highest major summits of the Caribbean, only Pico Duarte exceeds  elevation, six peaks exceed , and 15 peaks exceed  elevation.

Of these 20 peaks, three are located in the Dominican Republic, three in Cuba, two in Haiti, two in Saint Kitts and Nevis, one each in Jamaica, Guadeloupe, Dominica, Martinique, Puerto Rico, Saint Vincent and the Grenadines, Saint Lucia, Trinidad and Tobago, Montserrat, and Venezuela.

Most prominent summits

Of the 20 most prominent summits of the Caribbean, only Pico Duarte exceeds  of topographic prominence.  Four peaks exceed , seven peaks are ultra-prominent summits with at least , and 13 peaks exceed  of topographic prominence.

Of these 20 peaks, three are located in the Dominican Republic, two in Haiti, two in Saint Kitts and Nevis, and one each in Jamaica, Cuba, Guadeloupe, Dominica, Martinique, Puerto Rico, Saint Lucia, Trinidad and Tobago, Montserrat, Venezuela, Saba, and Grenada.

Most isolated major summits

Of the 20 most isolated major summits of the Caribbean, Pico Duarte and La Grande Soufrière exceed  of topographic isolation, seven peaks exceed , and 14 peaks exceed  of topographic isolation.

Of these 20 peaks, three are located in Cuba, two in the Dominican Republic, two in Haiti, two in Trinidad and Tobago, and one each in Guadeloupe, Puerto Rico, Jamaica, Saint Kitts and Nevis, Saint Vincent and the Grenadines, Granada, the British Virgin Islands, Martinique, Dominica, Montserrat, and Saint Lucia.

Gallery

See also

List of mountain peaks of North America
List of mountain peaks of Greenland
List of mountain peaks of Canada
List of mountain peaks of the Rocky Mountains
List of mountain peaks of the United States
List of mountain peaks of México
List of mountain peaks of Central America

List of the ultra-prominent summits of the Caribbean
List of extreme summits of the Caribbean
Caribbean
Geography of the Caribbean
Geology of the Caribbean
:Category:Mountains of the Caribbean
commons:Category:Mountains of the Caribbean
Physical geography
Topography
Topographic elevation
Topographic prominence
Topographic isolation

Notes

References

External links

Bivouac.com
Peakbagger.com
Peaklist.org
Peakware.com
Summitpost.org

 
Geography of the Caribbean

Caribbean-related lists
Caribbean, List Of Mountain Peaks Of The
Caribbean, List Of Mountain Peaks Of The
Caribbean, List Of Mountain Peaks Of The
Caribbean